Leptopodidae is a family of spiny-legged bugs in the order Hemiptera. There are about 15 genera and more than 40 described species in Leptopodidae.

Genera
These 15 genera belong to the family Leptopodidae:

 Erianotoides J.Polhemus & D.Polhemus, 1991
 Erianotus Fieber, 1861
 Lahima Linnavuori & Van Harten, 2002-22
 Leotichius Distant, 1904
 Leptopoides J.Polhemus & D.Polhemus, 1991-01
 Leptopus Latreille, 1809
 Martiniola Horváth, 1911
 Patapius Horváth, 1912
 Saldolepta Schuh & J.Polhemus, 1980
 Valleriola Distant, 1904
 † Archaesalepta Grimaldi & Engel, 2013 Cambay amber, India, Eocene
 † Cretaceomira McKellar & Engel, 2014 Canadian amber, Campanian
 † Cretaleptus Sun and Chen 2020 Burmese amber, Myanmar, Cenomanian
 † Grimaldinia Popov & Heiss, 2014-29 Burmese amber, Myanmar, Cenomanian
 † Leptosalda Cobben, 1971 Dominican amber, Mexican amber, Miocene
 † Leptosaldinea Popov & Heiss, 2016 Burmese amber, Myanmar, Cenomanian
 † Palaeoleptus Poinar 2009 Burmese amber, Myanmar, Cenomanian

References

Further reading

External links

 

 
Heteroptera families
Leptopodomorpha
Articles created by Qbugbot